This is a list of federal Superfund sites on the National Priorities List (NPL) in Oregon designated under the Comprehensive Environmental Response, Compensation, and Liability Act (CERCLA) environmental law. There are other federal Superfund sites in Oregon not on the NPL, which are shorter-term, cleanup sites. 

The CERCLA federal law of 1980 authorized the United States Environmental Protection Agency (EPA) to clean up contaminated properties and create the NPL list. On this list are the most polluted sites requiring a long-term response to clean up hazardous material contaminations.   

The NPL guides EPA in "determining which sites warrant further investigation" for significant environmental remediation. As of April 2010, there were thirteen Superfund sites on the National Priorities List in Oregon. Four sites have been cleaned up and removed from the list; none are currently proposed for entry on the list. The primary goal is to reduce the risks to human health and human health in the environment through a combination of cleanup, engineered controls like caps and site restrictions such as groundwater use restrictions. 

A secondary goal is to return the site to productive use as a business, recreation or as a natural ecosystem. Identifying the intended reuse early in the cleanup often results in faster and less expensive cleanups. EPA's Superfund Redevelopment Initiative provides tools and support for site redevelopment.

Superfund sites

See also
List of Superfund sites in the United States
List of environmental issues
List of waste types
TOXMAP

External links
EPA list of proposed Superfund sites in Oregon
EPA list of Superfund sites in Oregon
EPA list of Superfund site construction completions in Oregon
EPA list of partially deleted Superfund sites in Oregon
EPA list of deleted Superfund sites in Oregon
 Superfund Research Program at Oregon State University

References

Oregon

Superfund